This is a list of schools in the city of Portland, Maine.

Primary schools
Breakwater School (private)
Fred P. Hall Elementary School (public)
East End Community School (public)
Helen King Middle School (public)
Longfellow School (public)
Harrison Lyseth Elementary School (public)
Levey Day School (private - Jewish)
Ocean Avenue Elementary School (public)
Peaks Island Elementary School (public)
Presumpscot Elementary School (public)
Howard C. Reiche School (public)
Riverton Elementary School (public)
St. Brigid School (private – Catholic)

Middle/High schools
Cheverus High School  (private - Jesuit)
North Yarmouth Academy (private)
Waynflete School (private)
Cathedral School (private – Catholic)
Lincoln Middle School (public)
Lyman Moore Middle School (public)
 Portland High School (public)
 Deering High School (public)
 Baxter Academy for Technology and Science (charter)
Casco Bay High School (public)

Colleges and universities 
Maine College of Art
University of Maine School of Law
University of New England (Westbrook College Campus)
University of Southern Maine

 
Schools